The NASA Art Program was established in 1962. NASA administrator, James Webb, jump-started the program by recommending artists to become involved in the agency. Artists, including Norman Rockwell, Robert Rauschenberg, and Andy Warhol were commissioned to record the history of space exploration through the eyes of artists. The first director of the Art Program was James Dean (NASA). Using artists of different mediums and genres serves the purpose of educating different audiences about NASA and space exploration. To give the artists the best experience possible, NASA allowed them unprecedented access to sites and materials. Participants were present at suit-up, launch sites, and press releases. All works, from sketches to finished products, were given to NASA for use in museums and exhibitions. The collection now includes 2,500 works by more than 350 artists. The program still exists today but is much smaller.

How the program began
James Webb, an administrator from 1961 to 1968, put the program into effect. Webb wanted to use art to capture the emotions and importance of what NASA was doing. James Dean (an artist and NASA employee) became the head of the program with the help of Hereward Lester Cooke, a curator of National Galleys. To insure that the program would succeed, Cooke looked at similar programs that the air force had and decided that the program needed three things done: Use only commissioned artists, keep all of the sketches that the artists drew while they were observing, and give artists an idea of how to represent NASA, but still let them create whatever they wanted.

Major events

Project Mercury 
Artists first time observing a mission was the last Mercury launch, with Gordon Cooper's Faith 7. Robert McCall, Mitchell Jamieson, Peter Hurd, John McCoy, Lamar Dodd, Paul Calle and Robert Shore were the first group of artists chosen. Each artists was paid $800 for their services as well as the freedom to create whatever they wanted. The art created during the last Mercury launch made it possible for the program to continue.

Apollo 11 mission
In July 1969 the program had its biggest event. It captured the attention of the public so, the number of artists grew. Mission Control at NASA's Johnson Space Center in Houston and NASA's Kennedy Space Center in Florida are just two of the locations artist chose to observe. Soon after the mission, the director of the National Art gallery asked Dean, to use the art created during the mission.

Artists involved 

Anderson, Laurie— Music performance artist, The End of the Moon (2004)
Belbruno, Edward - Starscape Over Mountains on Another World
Cavallaro, Vincent — Painter, sculptor and abstract artist
Cunningham, James  - Abstract paintings
E.V. Day, Sculptor - "Wheel of Optimism.
Freeman, Fred- Saturn Blockhouse
Hancock, Theodore 
Hoffman, Martin - Sunrise Suit Up
Larkin, Sara — Painter, "Spacescapes"
Leibovitz, Annie — Photographer
Levy, Ellen- Space Chrysalis, 1985
Perimutter, Jack- Moon, Horizon & Flowers (Rocket Rollout)
Rauschenberg, Robert — Hot Shot, a montage chronicling the flight of a space shuttle
Riley, Terry and the Kronos Quartet — Music Composition
Rockwell, Norman— "Astronauts on the Moon"
Schmidt, Charles - "Spacelab 1", "The Moon Suit"
Solie, John- Servicing Hubble
Thon, William- Space Age Landscape
Warhol, Andy - Moonwalk 1
Wyeth, James - Gemini Launch Pad
Zeller, Daniel - Titan

First group of commissioned artists

 Calle, Paul - Designer of the 1969 stamp commemorating the first manned moon landing.
 Dodd, Lamar
 Hurd, Peter- Sky Lab
 Jamieson, Mitchell- First Steps
 McCall, Robert
 McCoy, John
 Shore, Robert

Personnel
Bertram Ulrich — Curator
Robert Schulman — Director, NASA Art Program, (1975 - 1994)
James Dean (NASA) — Founding Director, NASA Art Program, 1962-1974

Selected bibliography
 Visions of Flight: a retrospective from the NASA Art Collection; Schulman, Robert; National Aeronautics and Space Administration, Washington D.C; 1988
 Artistry of Space: the NASA art program; James Dean, Robert Schulman, Bertram Ulrich; Artrain USA, Ann Arbor, MI; 1999
 NASA & the Exploration of Space : with works from the NASA art collection; Roger D Launius, Bertram Ulrich;  Stewart, Tabori & Chang; New York, NY; 1998

References

External links
NASA/ART 50 Years of Exploration

Space art
Arts councils of the United States
Great Society programs
Independent agencies of the United States government
Organizations established in 1962
1962 establishments in the United States